Ramón Ernesto Cruz Uclés (4 January 1903 – 6 August 1985) was the President of Honduras from 7 June 1971 to 4 December 1972.

Biography
Cruz was born in San Juan de Flores in Honduras. His Father was Carlos Alberto Cruz and his mother Elisa Ucles Rosales. He was the eldest son, his brothers were: Herlinda, Carlos, Raul, Rene and Marta. In 1917 he attended the Escuela Normal for teachers where he graduated as primary school teacher. Later he went to Guatemala City where he obtained the title of Bachiller en Ciencias y Letras. He graduated in Science and Law from the National Autonomous University of Honduras (Universidad Nacional Autonoma de Honduras) in 1928(UCM).

He was Ambassador to El Salvador from 1946 to 1948.

He was a member of the Supreme Court from 1949 to 1964. He was also a member of the International Court of Justice in The Hague.

He was the National Party of Honduras (PN) candidate for president in 1963 but instead General Oswaldo López took power. However, López allowed further elections in April 1971 which Cruz won. After serving for 18 months he was removed from power in a military coup, again headed by López.

Ramón Ernesto Cruz died on 6 August 1985 at the age of 82 in Tegucigalpa.

References

1903 births
1985 deaths
Presidents of Honduras
National Party of Honduras politicians
Universidad Nacional Autónoma de Honduras alumni
Leaders ousted by a coup
Honduran Roman Catholics
People from Francisco Morazán Department
Ambassadors of Honduras to El Salvador